In cricket, an appeal (locally known as a “Howzat”) is the act of a player (or players) on the fielding team asking an umpire for a decision regarding whether a batter is out or not. According to Law 31 of the Laws of Cricket, an umpire may not rule a batter out unless the fielding side appeals for a decision. However, in practice most umpires will give a batter out to an obvious bowled or caught. On many occasions when a batter has otherwise technically been out, the fielding team has not realised, so neglected to appeal, and so the umpire has not declared them out. An appeal may be made at any point before the bowler starts their run-up for the next ball.

Cricket rules

According to the Laws of Cricket, an appeal is a verbal query, usually in the form of, "How's that?" to an umpire. Since the taking of a wicket is an important event in the game, members of the fielding team often shout this phrase with great enthusiasm, and it has transmuted into the slightly abbreviated form, "Howzat?", often with a greatly extended final syllable. Sometimes one or other syllable is omitted entirely, the player emitting an elongated cry of simply "How?" or "Zat?". Sometimes, players may turn to the umpire and simply just shout or cheer. Players often also raise their arms or point towards the umpire as part of the appeal.

Although technically an appeal is required for the umpire to make a decision, in practice it is often obvious to all that a batter is out, and the batter may walk off the field without waiting for the decision of the umpire. This is often the case when a batter is out bowled or to an obvious catch. However, the batter is always entitled to stand their ground and wait for a decision from the umpire. In cases where they consider they might not be out, such as a catch taken low near the grass or where it is not clear whether the ball hit the bat, batsmen will not take the walking option. It is then up to the fielding team to appeal for a decision. Sometimes a batter will walk even when it is not clear to others that they are out, if in their own mind they are certain they were out; this is considered to be the epitome of sportsmanship.

Decisions
Some decisions, such as leg before wicket, always require an appeal from the fielding side and the umpire's decision, as no batter will preempt the umpire on what, in practice, requires fine judgment of several factors. Run-outs and stumpings are usually appealed and are decided by an umpire, unless the batter is very clearly out of their ground and obviously out. Appealing differs vastly from sledging in the context that appealing is not supposed to be offensive, intimidating or directly taunting to the other team, and is more of a celebration to the appealing team. However, excessive appealing is specifically against the ICC's Code of Conduct.

Unsportsmanlike appealing
Under the ICC Cricket Code of Conduct, it is considered unsportsmanlike to:
 appeal excessively;
 appeal in an intimidating manner towards an umpire; or
 appeal under the knowledge that the batter is not out.
Any instances of such behaviour are punishable by awarding penalty runs, as adjudicated and imposed by the umpires, or fines or match bans, as adjudicated and imposed by the match referee.

See also
 Appeal play - a similar concept in baseball
 Cricket terminology
 Umpire Decision Review System

References

Cricket terminology
Cricket laws and regulations